Karajan may refer to:

 Karajan (surname), a surname
 Herbert von Karajan (1908–1989), an Austrian orchestra and opera conductor
 Herbert von Karajan Music Prize, an annual music award
 6973 Karajan, an asteroid